Thomas Joris Paul Alizier (born June 20, 1990) is a French Muay Thai kickboxer who competes in the cruiserweight and heavyweight divisions. Having begun practicing Muay Thai, Alizier first came to prominence due to a successful career by winning one European and two world championships as well as taking other medals. He turned professional, and signed with SUPERKOMBAT Fighting Championship in 2015 after becoming the ISKA European Heavyweight Champion under K-1 rules. He has previously competed in Enfusion.

Titles

Amateur  
International Federation of Muaythai Amateur  
2009 IFMA World Championships -86 kg/189 lb Silver Medalist 
World Muaythai Federation  
2010 WMF World Championships -86 kg/189 lb Gold Medalist 
2011 WMF European Championships -86 kg/189 lb Gold Medalist  
2013 WMF World Championships -86 kg/189 lb Silver Medalist  
World Combat Games 
2013 World Combat Games -91 kg/200 lb Muay Thai Bronze Medalist

Professional   
World Muaythai Federation  
2014 WMF World Cruiserweight (-91 kg/200 lb) Championships 
International Sport Karate Association
2014 ISKA European Heavyweight (-95.0 kg/209 lb) K-1 Championship

Kickboxing record

|-
|-  bgcolor="#CCFFCC"
| 2019-06-13 || Win ||align=left| Cédric Menereuilt || Triumph Fighting Tour || Paris, France ||  KO || 3 || 
|-
|-  bgcolor="FFBBBB"  
| 2015-06-19|| Loss ||align=left| Yassine Boughanem || Best Of Siam 6 || Paris, France || Decision (Unanimous) || 5 || 3:00
|-
|-  bgcolor="FFBBBB"  
| 2015-04-03 || Loss ||align=left| Andrei Stoica || SUPERKOMBAT World Grand Prix II 2015, Super Fight || Bucharest, Romania || TKO (Referee stoppage) || 2 || 2:39
|-
|-  bgcolor="#CCFFCC"
| 2014-12-13 || Win ||align=left| Miroslav Štverák || VICTORY 2 || Paris, France ||  Decision (unanimous) || 3 || 3:00 
|-
|-  bgcolor="#CCFFCC"
| 2014-07-12 || Win ||align=left| Rúben Barnabé || Enfusion Live #20 || Palma de Mallorca, Spain ||  TKO (retirement) || 2 || 3:00 
|-
|-  bgcolor="#CCFFCC"
| 2014-05-24 || Win ||align=left| Jasmin Bečirovič || Gorizia Fight Night II || Gorizia, Italy ||  Decision (unanimous) || 5 || 3:00 
|-
! style=background:white colspan=9 |
|-
|-  bgcolor="#CCFFCC"
| 2014-03-21 || Win ||align=left| Bogdan Moroz || WMF World Championship || Pattaya, Thailand || KO || 3 || 
|-
! style=background:white colspan=9 |
|-
|-  bgcolor="FFBBBB"  
| 2013-12-20 || Loss ||align=left| Petr Ondruš || Souboj Titanu, Tournament Final || Plzeň, Czech Republic || Decision (Unanimous) || 3 || 3:00
|-
|-  bgcolor="CCFFCC"  
| 2013-12-20 || Win ||align=left| Petr Kares || Souboj Titanu, Tournament Semifinal || Plzeň, Czech Republic || Decision (Unanimous) || 3 || 3:00
|-
|-  bgcolor="CCFFCC"  
| 2013-02-10 || Win ||align=left| Arthur Kouame || Championnat De France || Paris, France || TKO (Doctor stoppage) || 4 || 
|-
|-  bgcolor="FFBBBB"  
| 2011-12-10 || Loss ||align=left| Samih Bachar || Eliminatoires IDF || Paris, France || Decision (Unanimous) || 5 || 3:00
|-
| colspan=9 | Legend:        

|- style="background:#fbb;"
| 2013-10-21 || Loss ||align=left| Artem Vakhitov || 2013 World Combat Games -91 kg/200 lb Muay Thai, Semifinals || Saint Petersburg, Russia || TKO (corner stoppage) || 1 || 
|-
! style=background:white colspan=9 |
|-
|- style="background:#cfc;"
| 2013-10-19 || Win ||align=left| Frederic Langwgen || 2013 World Combat Games -91 kg/200 lb Muay Thai, Quarterfinals || Saint Petersburg, Russia || Decision || 3 || 2:00
|-
|- style="background:#fbb;"
| 2013-03-24 || Loss ||align=left| Vladislav Pomob || 2013 WMF World Championships, Tournament Final || Bangkok, Thailand || Decision (Unanimous) || 3 || 2:00
|-
! style=background:white colspan=9 |
|-
|- style="background:#cfc;"
| 2013-03-23 || Win ||align=left| Daniel Romy || 2013 WMF World Championships, Tournament Semifinal || Bangkok, Thailand || Decision (Unanimous) || 3 || 2:00
|-
|- style="background:#cfc;"
| 2010-03-22 || Win ||align=left| Borulko Dmytro || 2010 WMF World Championships, Tournament Final || Bangkok, Thailand || Decision (Unanimous) || 3 || 2:00
|-
! style=background:white colspan=9 |
|-
|- style="background:#fbb;"
| 2009-03 || Loss ||align=left| Adam Lazarević || 2009 IFMA World Championships, Tournament Final || Bangkok, Thailand || Decision (Unanimous) || 3 || 2:00
|-
! style=background:white colspan=9 |
|-
|- style="background:#cfc;"
| 2009-03 || Win ||align=left| Hemant Kumar || 2009 IFMA World Championships, Tournament Semifinal || Bangkok, Thailand || KO (Knee) || 1 || 
|-
|- style="background:#cfc;"
| 2009-03 || Win ||align=left| Mohamed Said || 2009 IFMA World Championships, Tournament Quarterfinal || Bangkok, Thailand || KO (Right straight) || 3 || 
|-
|- style="background:#cfc;"
| 2009-03 || Win ||align=left| Berkotti || 2009 IFMA World Championships, Tournament Opening Round || Bangkok, Thailand || Decision (Unanimous) || 3 || 2:00 
|-
| colspan=9 | Legend:

See also 
List of male kickboxers

References

External links
 MUAYTHAITV profile
 The Big Boys Getting Ready for the Big Game

1990 births
Living people
Sportspeople from Paris
French male kickboxers
Cruiserweight kickboxers
Heavyweight kickboxers
French Muay Thai practitioners
SUPERKOMBAT kickboxers